James Thomas Jr. (born June 23, 1984) is an American television personality known for his appearances as a contestant on the American television show Survivor. He first appeared in the 18th season, Survivor: Tocantins in which he won the title of Sole Survivor and the  grand prize. Thomas later appeared as a contestant in the 20th season Survivor: Heroes vs. Villains, finishing in tenth place. He returned to play for a third time on the 34th season: Survivor: Game Changers where he placed 16th.

Early life
Thomas was raised in Samson, Alabama, graduated from Troy University as a business marketing major, and currently resides in Mobile, Alabama.

Survivor

Tocantins
On May 17, 2009, it was revealed that he had been voted the winner of Survivor: Tocantins, having received all seven jury votes (cast by Brendan Synnott, Tyson Apostol, Sierra Reed, Debbie Beebe, Benjamin "Coach" Wade, Tamara "Taj" Johnson-George, and Erinn Lobdell), beating out corporate consultant and friend Stephen Fishbach. In addition to his million-dollar win, Thomas also won the $100,000 prize for Sprint Player of the Season, beating out fellow fan favorites Johnson-George and Reed. Thomas was the sixth person to win Survivor's million-dollar prize without ever having any votes cast against him at Tribal Council—preceded by Tina Wesson (The Australian Outback), Ethan Zohn (Africa), Brian Heidik (Thailand), Sandra Diaz-Twine (Pearl Islands), and Tom Westman (Palau). He was also the second person to win the million-dollar prize as a result of a unanimous vote—preceded by Earl Cole (Fiji), and the second consecutive person to win both the million dollars and the $100,000, preceded by Bob Crowley (Gabon).

Thomas is the first player ever to win Sole Survivor by a unanimous vote while never receiving any votes against him during the entire game.  The only other two Survivor castaways to accomplish this feat are John Cochran in Survivor: Caramoan and Jeremy Collins in Survivor: Cambodia. However, neither Cochran nor Collins won the $100,000 prize for Sprint Player of the Season (it had been discontinued by the time Collins won Sole Survivor), and Collins received votes against him which were nullified by a hidden immunity idol.

Thomas also performed with distinction in the challenges. During the reward challenge in Episode Four, Thomas carried 220 pounds before dropping out, tying the record previously set by Pearl Islands contestant Rupert Boneham, who had also carried 220 pounds before dropping out.  At the immunity challenge that followed, Thomas came close to single-handedly winning immunity for Jalapao—by catching four out of the five balls needed to win, although Timbira won the challenge in the end. (In the process, Thomas knocked out a tooth—which Jeff Probst saved and later gave to Thomas's mother at the reunion special.) Thomas also won more post-merge reward and immunity challenges than anyone else in his season, with three reward challenges (the first two and the last one) and three immunity challenges (the last three consecutive ones).

Because Thomas won the game unanimously, without having had a single vote cast against him, was awarded the $100,000 player-of-the-season prize, and won more individual challenges than anyone else by a considerable margin, he has been said to have played the first "perfect game" in Survivor history.

Heroes vs. Villains
Thomas was chosen to participate in the 20th season of Survivor as a member of the Heroes tribe. While he was part of this tribe, he made side deals with Tom Westman and Colby Donaldson, even though he was also in the majority alliance along with Amanda Kimmel, Candice Woodcock, Cirie Fields, James Clement, and Rupert Boneham. Thomas also switched his vote at the Heroes' third tribal council, which resulted in the elimination of Fields, foiling his original alliance's plan to vote off Donaldson or Westman, who played his hidden immunity idol.

Despite this betrayal, he maintained his place in the Heroes tribe, and stuck with the majority after voting off Westman, who was seen as a threat, and Clement, who was a liability due to his injury at the "Schmergen Brawl" challenge. After a string of losses, Thomas's tribe of Heroes rallied and went on to win the next few challenges, thus maintaining immunity until the merge. When the Heroes tribe won a reward challenge in Episode 7, they found a clue to a hidden immunity idol and agreed to find it as a tribe. Nevertheless, Thomas decided to look for the idol by himself. He found it, but he was intending to keep it to himself to further his individual interests. However, Kimmel noticed that Thomas had found it, so Thomas was forced to reveal his find to the tribe.

After several men of the Villains tribe were voted out, Thomas and other members of the Heroes tribe assumed there must be an alliance of the Villains' women, whereas in fact the alliance orchestrating these votes consisted of Russell Hantz, Parvati Shallow, and Danielle DiLorenzo. Thomas came up with a plan to give his tribe's hidden immunity idol to Hantz to keep him from being eliminated by the "female alliance", thinking that, once the tribes merged, Hantz would side with the Heroes and together they would be able to vote out Shallow, the Villain they assumed was biggest threat.

When the tribes merged, Hantz feigned allegiance to the Heroes, and Thomas and his tribemates still assumed that Hantz was on their side, even though Hantz had not used the idol the Heroes had given him to eliminate Shallow, and even though Villains tribe member Sandra Diaz-Twine, who was on the outs with the Villains tribe, told Rupert Boneham there was no female alliance and explained what was really going on. Boneham relayed this information to the Heroes and warned Thomas that he shouldn't be putting all of his trust into Hantz, but Thomas did not believe what Diaz-Twine had said.

At the first post-merge tribal council, just as Diaz-Twine had warned, the Villains all stuck together. Shallow played her own idol to protect Diaz-Twine, and also played the idol Thomas had given to Hantz (which Hantz had given to Shallow), to protect Jerri Manthey, whom the Heroes had voted for. With the votes against Manthey negated by the immunity idol, since all five Villains had voted for Thomas, he was the one eliminated by a 5–0 vote. Thus he became the 11th person voted off, the first person to be eliminated after the merge, and the third member of the jury. As a result of his move, at the live reunion special, Thomas was awarded a trophy for the dumbest move in Survivor history.

Thomas cast his jury vote for Diaz-Twine to win the game. This vote, along with those of fellow jurors Yates, Kimmel, Woodcock, Boneham and Donaldson, helped secure Diaz-Twine her second victory by a 6-3-0 vote.

Game Changers
On February 8, 2017, Thomas was revealed to be a contestant on the 34th season of Survivor, entitled Survivor: Game Changers. Amongst all the players that won on their first try, Thomas is the first male winner to play three times. Thomas started out as the sole former winner on the Nuku tribe, but his challenge prowess allowed him to avoid tribal council for the first two challenges. However, Thomas would find himself in a precarious position when the first tribe swap occurred, placing him as the only original Nuku member in the new tribe. Desperate to strengthen his position, Thomas took the new Nuku tribe fishing in the ocean but at one point, he abandoned the tribe and went back to camp to search for a hidden immunity idol, but was unsuccessful. However, Thomas was able to build social bonds with new tribemates Malcolm Freberg and Aubry Bracco.

Thomas set his sights on fellow Heroes vs. Villains castaway Sandra Diaz-Twine, due to a fear that Diaz-Twine was targeting the other former winners on the season in an attempt to outlast them (having already voted out the other previous winner on the season, Tony Vlachos, before the tribe swap). On Day 11, Jeff Probst announced that only one tribe would win immunity and the other two tribes would go to Tribal Council. Tavua won immunity. Probst then said that both Mana and Nuku would go to Tribal Council together and vote out one person. At the Nuku camp, Thomas suggested that they vote out Tai Trang for being sneaky, but Diaz-Twine wanted Sierra Dawn Thomas (no relation to J.T.) out. During a chaotic Tribal Council, Thomas went to his former Nuku ally Brad Culpepper and leaked the plan that Sierra was the target, urging him to vote for Diaz-Twine. However, this plan backfired when Trang played his hidden immunity idol on Sierra. Mana, meanwhile, had targeted Freberg as the biggest physical and social threat on his tribe, and voted him out of the game.

After returning from camp, Thomas tried to avoid the blame for Freberg's elimination, but he recognized his days were numbered without an idol. He searched for one the following day and was successful in locating it. However, the rest of the tribe saw Thomas as an unreliable loose cannon, and Diaz-Twine saw an opportunity to exploit that. After Nuku won a reward challenge, Thomas expressed annoyance at fellow tribemate Michaela Bradshaw for a perceived overuse of sugar with coffee. Diaz-Twine purposefully ate the rest of the sugar and let Thomas's discontentment broil into a full-blown feud with Bradshaw. After Nuku lost the next immunity challenge, he attempted to rally the votes against Bradshaw, perceiving her as the consensus weak link in the tribe. However, Bradshaw and Diaz-Twine were set on voting out Thomas, leaving Jeff Varner as the swing vote. Believing he was secure in his newfound position, Thomas elected not to bring his hidden immunity idol to tribal council. This proved a devastating misread of the situation, as ultimately Varner sided with Diaz-Twine and Bradshaw, blindsiding Thomas in 16th place.

Filmography

Television

References

External links
 CBS official biography 

1984 births
Winners in the Survivor franchise
American cattlemen
Living people
Participants in American reality television series
People from Geneva County, Alabama
Survivor (American TV series) winners
Troy University alumni